Bathuva is a village and panchayat in Ganguvari Sigadam mandal, Srikakulam district of Andhra Pradesh, India. There is a railway station at Bathuva in Chennai-Howrah mainline of East Coast Railway, Indian Railways. State Bank of India has a branch at Bathuva.

References

Villages in Srikakulam district